Cesare Antonio Accius (or Accer) was an Italian engraver working in the early 17th century. According to William Young Ottley, writing in 1831, his work was known from a single print, showing a mountainous landscape, with a chapel, a large house and three figures, one of which is beating a drum. The artist signed it "Cesare Antoni Accius, fecit, inv. A.D. 1609.".

The Yale University Art Gallery has an impression of a print answering  this description  under the title Landscape  with Men Stealing Waterfowl.

References

Sources

Italian engravers
17th-century Italian artists